The John Stith Pemberton statue is a public statue in Atlanta, Georgia, United States. Located in Pemberton Place, near the World of Coca-Cola, the statue is of John Stith Pemberton, the inventor of Coca-Cola.

History 
John Stith Pemberton, a pharmacist in Atlanta, invented Coca-Cola in 1886. He sold the formula two years later to Asa Griggs Candler, who shortly thereafter founded The Coca-Cola Company. In 2007, the company opened a new museum in downtown Atlanta called the World of Coca-Cola. That same year, the statue of Pemberton was unveiled outside the museum, in an area called Pemberton Place, named in his honor. The statue was designed by artist Russ Faxon.

Design 
His left hand is resting on a table while he lifts up a glass of Coca-Cola with his right hand.

See also 

 2007 in art

References

External links 
 

2007 establishments in Georgia (U.S. state)
2007 sculptures
Bronze sculptures in Georgia (U.S. state)
Coca-Cola buildings and structures
Statues in Atlanta